Iona McLeish is a London Theatre Award-winning British theatre designer and author that currently serves as head of the BA programme in theatre design at London drama school Rose Bruford College.

A graduate in theatre design at Wimbledon School of Art, McLeish has worked extensively as a theatre designer in the United Kingdom. Productions she designed include Women of Troy for the National Theatre, Timberlake Wertenbaker's The Love of a Nightingale for the Royal Shakespeare Company, Marguerite Duras' India Song (directed by Annie Castledine and Annabel Arden) at Theatr Clwyd, Duras' Savannah Bay at the Battersea Arts Centre, Shakespeare's The Merchant of Venice (directed by Michael Attenborough) at The Young Vic and Heresies by Deborah Levy for the Royal Shakespeare Company.

External links
 Rose Bruford College

People associated with Rose Bruford College
Year of birth missing (living people)
Living people
Alumni of Wimbledon College of Arts